The men's high jump event  at the Friendship Games was held on 18 August 1984 at the Grand Arena of the Central Lenin Stadium in Moscow, Soviet Union. The competition took place in a pouring rain which affected the results. Two Soviet athletes starting out of competition recorded better results than the official medallists.

Results

See also
Athletics at the 1984 Summer Olympics – Men's high jump

References
 

Athletics at the Friendship Games
Friendship Games